is a Japanese football player who plays for FC Machida Zelvia.

Career
Ryujoseph Hashimura joined the J2 League club FC Machida Zelvia in 2017. On 7 February 2019, Hashimura was loaned out to the Brazilian club PSTC.

Club statistics
Updated to 22 February 2018.

References

External links
Profile at Machida Zelvia

Ryujoseph Hashimura at Footballdatabase

2000 births
Living people
Association football people from Tokyo Metropolis
People from Fuchū, Tokyo
Japanese footballers
Japanese expatriate footballers
Japanese people of English descent
J2 League players
FC Machida Zelvia players
Association football forwards
Japanese expatriate sportspeople in Brazil
Expatriate footballers in Brazil